The Weightlifting at the '1965 Southeast Asian Peninsular Games was held between 15 to 17 December at Chinese Assembly Hall, Kuala Lumpur.

Medal summary

Men

Medal table

Sources
 https://eresources.nlb.gov.sg/newspapers/Digitised/Article/straitstimes19651216-1.2.119
 https://eresources.nlb.gov.sg/newspapers/Digitised/Article/straitstimes19651217-1.2.123.2
 https://eresources.nlb.gov.sg/newspapers/Digitised/Article/straitstimes19651218-1.2.125
 https://eresources.nlb.gov.sg/newspapers/Digitised/Article/straitstimes19651219-1.2.76

1965
Events at the 1965 Southeast Asian Peninsular Games